Lyduvėnai Railway Bridge is one of the longest bridges in Lithuania. It crosses the river Dubysa. It is located in Lyduvėnai, Raseiniai district.

References 

Railway bridges in Lithuania
Buildings and structures in Kaunas County